This is a list of events from British radio in 1962.

Events

January to May
No events.

June
27 June – The Pilkington Committee on Broadcasting publishes its report, recommending that the BBC should extend its activities to the creation of local radio stations to forestall the introduction of commercial radio. In 1962 the BBC runs a series of closed circuit experiments in local radio from a variety of locations across England.

July
No events.

August
28 August – The BBC begins experimental stereo radio broadcasts.

September
No events.

October
30 October – The BBC Radio comedy The Men from the Ministry is first aired.

November
No events.

December
23 December – David Jacobs presents Pick of the Pops for the final time.

Programme debuts
 October – The Men from the Ministry (1962–1977)

Programme endings
19 May – Variety Playhouse on the BBC Home Service (1953–1962)

Continuing radio programmes

1940s
 Music While You Work (1940–1967)
 Sunday Half Hour (1940–2018)
 Desert Island Discs (1942–Present)
 Family Favourites (1945–1980)
 Down Your Way (1946–1992)
 Have A Go (1946–1967)
 Housewives' Choice (1946–1967)
 Letter from America (1946–2004)
 Woman's Hour (1946–Present)
 Twenty Questions (1947–1976)
 Any Questions? (1948–Present)
 Mrs Dale's Diary (1948–1969)
 Billy Cotton Band Show (1949–1968)
 A Book at Bedtime (1949–Present)

1950s
 The Archers (1950–Present)
 Listen with Mother (1950–1982)
 From Our Own Correspondent (1955–Present)
 Pick of the Pops (1955–Present)
 The Clitheroe Kid (1957–1972)
 My Word! (1957–1988)
 Test Match Special (1957–Present)
 The Today Programme (1957–Present)
 The Navy Lark (1959–1977)
 Sing Something Simple (1959–2001)
 Your Hundred Best Tunes (1959–2007)

1960s
 Farming Today (1960–Present)
 Easy Beat (1960–1967)
 In Touch (1961–Present)

Births
25 January – Emma Freud, broadcaster, script editor and cultural commentator
27 January – Adrian Allen, radio personality
21 February – Vanessa Feltz, television personality, broadcaster and journalist
18 March – Bob Shennan, radio executive, Controller of BBC Radio 2 from 2009
26 March – Richard Coles, musician, journalist and Church of England priest
May – Terry Christian, radio and television presenter
6 June – Sarah Parkinson, producer and writer of radio and television programmes (died 2003)
27 June – Michael Ball, actor, singer and radio and TV presenter
15 July – Iain Dale, political writer and broadcaster
12 November
Mariella Frostrup, Norwegian-born broadcast presenter
Mark Porter, television and radio presenter and GP
17 November – Alice Arnold, newsreader and continuity announcer
16 December – Ian Payne, radio and television sports broadcaster
30 December – Kevin Greening, radio presenter, host of the Radio 1 breakfast show from 1997 to 1998 (died 2007)
Unknown
Jack Docherty, Scottish-born comedian
Torquil Riley-Smith, founder of LBH, Britain's first gay radio station

See also 
 1962 in British music
 1962 in British television
 1962 in the United Kingdom
 List of British films of 1962

References

 
Radio
Years in British radio